The following are the national records in athletics in Ecuador maintained by Ecuador's national athletics federation: Federación Ecuatoriana de Atletismo (FEA).

Outdoor

Key to tables:

+ = en route to a longer distance

h = hand timing

a = aided road course according to IAAF rule 260.28

A = affected by altitude

NWI = no wind measurement

# = not recognised by World Athletics

OT = oversized track (> 200m in circumference)

Men

Women

Mixed

Indoor

Men

Women

Notes

References
General
Ecuadorian Outdoor Records 21 October 2021 updated
Specific

External links
FEA web site

Ecuador
Records
Athletics
Athletics